Marius Ioan Feher (born 8 June 1989) is a Romanian professional footballer who plays as a midfielder for CS Florești.

References

External links
 
 

1989 births
Living people
Sportspeople from Bistrița
Romanian footballers
Association football midfielders
Liga I players
ACF Gloria Bistrița players
Liga II players
CS Sportul Snagov players
CS Luceafărul Oradea players
FC Unirea Dej players